Alvin Guy Porter is a former professional American football player who played cornerback for three seasons for the Baltimore Ravens in the National Football League.

1977 births
Living people
Players of American football from Shreveport, Louisiana
American football cornerbacks
Baltimore Ravens players
Oklahoma State Cowboys football players
New Orleans VooDoo players
Kansas City Brigade players